The 1925–26 season in Swedish football, starting August 1925 and ending July 1926:

Honours

Official titles

Competitions

Promotions, relegations and qualifications

Promotions

League transfers

Relegations

Domestic results

Allsvenskan 1925–26

Allsvenskan promotion play-off 1925–26

Division 2 Uppsvenska Serien 1925–26

Division 2 Mellansvenska Serien 1925–26

Division 2 Östsvenska Serien 1925–26

Division 2 Västsvenska Serien 1925–26

Division 2 Sydsvenska Serien 1925–26

Svenska Mästerskapet 1925 
Final

Norrländska Mästerskapet 1926 
Final

National team results 

 Sweden: 

 Sweden: 

 Sweden: 

 Sweden: 

 Sweden: 

 Sweden: 

 Sweden: 

 Sweden: 

 Sweden: 

 Sweden:

National team players in season 1925/26

Notes

References 
Print

Online

 
Seasons in Swedish football